Ernest Nagel (November 16, 1901 – September 20, 1985) was an American philosopher of science.  Along with Rudolf Carnap, Hans Reichenbach, and Carl Hempel, he is sometimes seen as one of the major figures of the logical positivist movement. His 1961 book The Structure of Science is considered a foundational work in the logic of scientific explanation.

Life and career
Nagel was born in Nové Mesto nad Váhom (now in Slovakia, then Vágújhely and part of the Austro-Hungarian Empire) to Jewish parents. His mother, Frida Weiss, was from the nearby town of Vrbové (or Verbo). He emigrated to the United States at the age of 10 and became a U.S. citizen in 1919. He received a BSc from the City College of New York in 1923, and earned his PhD from Columbia University in 1931, with a dissertation on the concept of measurement. Except for one year (1966-1967) at Rockefeller University, he spent his entire academic career at Columbia. He became the first John Dewey Professor of Philosophy there in 1955. And then University Professor from 1967 until his retirement in 1970, after which he continued to teach. In 1977, he was one of the few philosophers elected to the National Academy of Sciences.

His work concerned the philosophy of mathematical fields such as geometry and probability, quantum mechanics, and the status of reductive and inductive theories of science. His book The Structure of Science (1961) practically inaugurated the field of analytic philosophy of science. He expounded the different kinds of explanation in different fields, and was sceptical about attempts to unify the nature of scientific laws or explanations. He was the first to propose that by positing analytic equivalencies (or "bridge laws") between the terms of different sciences, one could eliminate all ontological commitments except those required by the most basic science. He also upheld the view that social sciences are scientific, and should adopt the same standards as natural sciences.

Nagel wrote An Introduction to Logic and the Scientific Method with Morris Raphael Cohen, his CCNY teacher in 1934. In 1958, he published with James R. Newman Gödel's proof, a short book explicating Gödel's incompleteness theorems to those not well trained in mathematical logic. He edited the Journal of Philosophy (1939–1956) and the Journal of Symbolic Logic (1940-1946).

As a public intellectual, he supported a skeptical approach to claims of the paranormal, becoming one of the first sponsors and fellows of the Committee for Skeptical Inquiry in 1976, along with 24 other notable philosophers like W. V. Quine. The committee posthumously inducted him into their "Pantheon of Skeptics" in recognition of Nagel's contributions to the cause of scientific skepticism. Nagel was an atheist.

Nagel was an elected member of the American Philosophical Society (1962) and the American Academy of Arts and Sciences (1981).

He died in New York. He had two sons, Alexander Nagel (professor of mathematics at the University of Wisconsin) and Sidney Nagel (professor of physics at the University of Chicago).

Nagel's doctoral students include Morton White, Patrick Suppes, Henry Kyburg, Isaac Levi, and Kenneth Schaffner.

A festschrift, Philosophy, Science and Method: Essays in Honor of Ernest Nagel, was published in 1969.

Select works
On The Logic of Measurement (1930)
An Introduction to Logic and Scientific Method (with M. R. Cohen, 1934)
 "The Formation of Modern Conceptions of Formal Logic in the Development of Geometry" (1939)
 Principles of the Theory of Probability (1939) 
 "The Meaning of Reduction in the Natural Sciences" (1949)
 Sovereign Reason (1954)
 Logic without Metaphysics (1957)
 Gödel’s Proof (with J. R. Newman, 1958)
 The Structure of Science: Problems in the Logic of Scientific Explanation (1961, second ed. 1979) 
 Observation and Theory in Science (with others, 1971)
 Teleology Revisited and Other Essays in the Philosophy and History of Science (1979)

References

Further reading 

 Suppes, P. (2006). Ernest Nagel.* In S. Sarkar & Pfeifer, J. (Eds.), The Philosophy of Science: An Encyclopedia (N-Z Indexed., Vol. 2, pp. 491-496). New York: Routledge. [*author eprint]

1901 births
1985 deaths
20th-century American essayists
20th-century American male writers
20th-century American philosophers
20th-century atheists
Jewish American atheists
American logicians
American male essayists
American male non-fiction writers
American people of Jewish descent
American people of Slovak descent
American philosophy academics
American skeptics
Analytic philosophers
Atheist philosophers
Center for Advanced Study in the Behavioral Sciences fellows
Columbia University alumni
Columbia University faculty
Corresponding Fellows of the British Academy
Empiricists
Historians of philosophy
Historians of science
History of logic
History of mathematics
History of science
Jewish philosophers
Logical positivism
Mathematical logicians
Members of the United States National Academy of Sciences
Ontologists
People from Nové Mesto nad Váhom
Philosophers of logic
Philosophers of mathematics
Philosophers of science
Philosophers of social science
Philosophy writers
Probability theorists
City College of New York alumni
Austro-Hungarian emigrants to the United States
Members of the American Philosophical Society